Jacques Thébault (4 November 1924 – 15 July 2015)  was a French actor. He has dubbed for or been the voice artist for:

 Robert Conrad
 Steve McQueen
 Patrick McGoohan
 Bill Cosby
 Roy Scheider
 Lucky Luke (before Antoine de Caunes)
 Jeremy Brett, from Sherlock Holmes for Granada
 One of the voice overs in Amélie.

References

External links
 

1924 births
2015 deaths
French comedians
French male voice actors